Laura Anna Benkarth (born 14 October 1992) is a German footballer who plays for Bayern Munich and the German national team.

Professional career
Benkarth began her career at SV Biengen and FC Wolfenweiler-Schallstadt. In 2008, she arrived in the youth department of the SC Freiburg where she played for the B-Jugend. In 2009, she moved to the senior squad as a second goalkeeper and made his debut on 20 September 2009 (1st Round) in the 0:1 defeat at home to the FF USV Jena. In her first season, she was used only three times at senior level. In her second season, Benkarth played 13 games and her participation increased in the third season with 22 appearances. In 2014, with the departure of Caroline Abbé to FC Bayern Munich, she was nominated the new team captain.

International career
In 2007, she was on the Germany U17 squad which was the champion in the 2009 UEFA Women's Under-17 Championship. With the Germany U19 team in 2010, Benkarth took part in the 2010 UEFA Women's Under-19 Championship in Macedonia. The team reached the semi-finals, but lost, for the future champion, France in the penalties (5–3). That same year she was part of the national team that won the 2010 FIFA U-20 Women's World Cup in their own country, remained as the third goalkeeper behind Almuth Schult and Desirée Schumann without playing any match. In the 2012 FIFA U-20 Women's World Cup in Japan she played every minute in all six matches, Germany played in the tournament without conceding one single goal (clean sheet). Germany only lost in the final against the United States, for the minimum score, 1:0 (goal scored by Kealia Ohai ). Benkarth was named the best goalkeeper of the tournament with the "Golden Glove". In October 2012 Benkarth was nominated for the senior national team for the first time. In until 28 July 2013 she was called for the UEFA Women's Euro 2013 in Sweden, replacing Kathrin Längert in the squad.

She was part of the squad for the 2016 Summer Olympics, where Germany won the gold medal.

Career statistics

International

Honours

Club
Bayern Munich
Frauen-Bundesliga (1): 2020-21

International
Germany U-17
UEFA U-17 Women's Championship: Winner 2009

Germany U-20
FIFA U-20 Women's World Cup: Winner 2010

Germany
Summer Olympic Games: Gold medal, 2016
UEFA Women's Championship:  Winner 2013

Individual
FIFA U-20 Women's World Cup: Golden Glove 2012

References

External links

Profile at DFB 
Player German domestic football stats at DFB 
 
 

Living people
1992 births
German women's footballers
Women's association football goalkeepers
Sportspeople from Freiburg im Breisgau
SC Freiburg (women) players
FC Bayern Munich (women) players
2015 FIFA Women's World Cup players
Germany women's international footballers
Footballers at the 2016 Summer Olympics
Olympic gold medalists for Germany
Olympic medalists in football
Medalists at the 2016 Summer Olympics
Frauen-Bundesliga players
Footballers from Baden-Württemberg
Olympic footballers of Germany
UEFA Women's Championship-winning players
2019 FIFA Women's World Cup players
20th-century German women
21st-century German women
UEFA Women's Euro 2017 players